Sparganothis demissana is a species of moth of the family Tortricidae. It is found in North America, including Florida, Mississippi, Oklahoma and Texas in the United States and Tamaulipas in Mexico.

The wingspan is about 15 mm.

References

Moths described in 1879
Sparganothis